The dwarf honeyguide (Indicator pumilio) is a species of bird in the family Indicatoridae.
It is endemic to the Albertine Rift montane forests.
It is threatened by habitat loss.
Just like other honeyguides, this species is a brood parasite.

References

dwarf honeyguide
Birds of Central Africa
dwarf honeyguide
dwarf honeyguide
Taxonomy articles created by Polbot